Stenoma sericata is a moth of the family Depressariidae. It is found in Brazil (Amazonas) and French Guiana.

The wingspan is about 23 mm. The forewings are whitish fuscous, with a faint violet tinge and with the costal edge orange. The stigmata are small and dark fuscous, the plical obliquely beyond the first discal. There is a small dark fuscous spot on the middle of the costa, and a larger triangular one at four-fifths, where a curved series of dark fuscous dots runs to the dorsum before the tornus. There is also a terminal series of subquadrate dark fuscous dots. The hindwings are whitish yellowish, suffused with ochreous yellow towards the apex and upper part of the termen.

References

Moths described in 1877
Stenoma